The Bečva (also Betsch, Beczwa) is a river in the Czech Republic. It is a left tributary of the river Morava. The Bečva is created by two source streams, the northern Rožnovská Bečva (whose valley separates the Moravian-Silesian Beskids in the north from the Hostýn-Vsetín Mountains in the south) and the southern Vsetínská Bečva (whose valley separates the Hostýn-Vsetín Mountains in the north from the Javorníky in the south). It is 61.6 km long, and its basin area is 1,613 km2.

References

Moravian-Silesian Beskids
Rivers of the Olomouc Region
Rivers of the Zlín Region
Braided rivers in Europe
Moravian Wallachia